Legislative Assembly elections were held in the Indian state of West Bengal on March 11, 1972.

Background
The election was the 4th assembly election in West Bengal within six years. President's Rule had been introduced soon after the 1971 West Bengal Legislative Assembly election.

Contenders
There were two main fronts in the election; the alliance between the Congress(R) and CPI and the alliance led by CPI(M). The Congress(R)-CPI alliance was known as the Progressive Democratic Alliance. The PDA had a seven-point programme. At the time of the election Indira Gandhi's popularity peaked, with the victory in the Bangladesh Liberation War and electoral promises of land reform. The CPI had also gained significant prestige in West Bengal due to the Soviet support to the Bangladeshi cause in the war.

The CPI(M)-led alliance included the Revolutionary Socialist Party, the Socialist Unity Centre, the Revolutionary Communist Party of India, the Marxist Forward Bloc, the Workers Party of India, the Biplobi Bangla Congress and some independents. Just before the vote there was a seat-sharing arrangement between the CPI(M)-led alliance and the All India Forward Bloc. A minor third front, the West Bengal Democratic Alliance, was led by the Congress (O) and included Sushil Kumar Dhara's Bangla Congress faction, the rebel Samyukta Socialist Party faction and the Indian Awami League.

Results
The Congress(R)-CPI alliance won an overwhelming majority in the assembly and formed a new state government, led by Siddhartha Shankar Ray. Several Indian Youth Congress leaders were found among the newly elected legislators. 14 CPI(M) candidates were declared elected, but they refused to participate in the Legislative Assembly during the period of 1972-1977 as they accused that the elections had been rigged.

Results by constituency

Reception
While there were several killings during the election campaign, electoral violence had declined compared to previous elections in West Bengal.

The elections were marred by accusations of rigging. CPI(M) and its allies refused to accept the election result. The left parties argued that in 172 constituencies the election had not been free and fair, accusing the Congress(R) of letting loose 'semi-fascist terror' in West Bengal. They protested by interrupting the President's speech in the Lok Sabha and in the Rajya Sabha. The Congress(O) also made accusations of rigging. The former Chief Minister Prafulla Chandra Sen on the other hand alleged that the election had been rigged in at least 45 constituencies.

References

West Bengal
State Assembly elections in West Bengal
1970s in West Bengal